WTNA (1430 AM) is an oldies radio station licensed to Altoona, Pennsylvania. The station airs an oldies format and is branded as "Toona 1430 & 99.7". The station is owned by Seven Mountains Media.

WTNA is the flagship station for Altoona Curve baseball. It is also the Altoona affiliate of the Penn State Sports Network, Pittsburgh Steelers Football Network, and Pitt Basketball games on the Pitt ISP Radio Network.

Changes
On January 2, 2013, the station dropped the Jim Rome Show and replaced it with The Herd with Colin Cowherd.

History
Originally WVAM, it became a CBS affiliate when it went on the air December 15, 1947. At that time, it operated on 1430 kHz with 1,000 watts power.

On February 6, 2019, WVAM changed their format from sports to oldies, branded as "Toona 1430". On March 15, 2019, the station changed its call sign to WTNA.

In November 2020, the station launched a 250-watt translator on 99.7 to serve the Altoona area.  With the launch of the translator, the branding was adjusted to "Toona 1430 & 99.7".

Sale to Seven Mountains Media
It was announced on October 12, 2022 that Forever Media is selling 34 stations, including WTNA and the entire Altoona cluster, to State College-based Seven Mountains Media for $17.3 million. The deal closed on January 2, 2023.

Previous logo

References

External links

Oldies radio stations in the United States
TNA
Radio stations established in 1948
1948 establishments in Pennsylvania